The William H. Thomas Gallery, affectionately known as "The Gallery in the Hood," is one of the oldest, continuously operated, black-owned, independent art galleries in the United States. It is located in Olde Towne East, Columbus, Ohio. It was opened to the public in 1989 by curator and owner Chief Baba Shango Obadina and has since played an influential role in promoting the work and careers of local, black artists, including Queen Brooks, "Grandpa Smoky" Brown, Antoinette Savage, April Sunami, Barbara Chavous, MacArthur Fellow, and Aminah Robinson.

History
Obadina (and several of his former Columbus East High School classmates, including Detroit's George N'Namdi) was an early pioneer in the world of independent, black art. He purchased the house that would become the gallery from the Columbus, Ohio land bank for only $200, in 1976. Over the next thirteen years, he laboriously restored it, adding unique features, such as a floor made from inlaid discs of wood and a hand-carved wooden door.

Programs
The gallery has quarterly art openings featuring local, black performers, such as poet Is Said, and hosts regular "think tanks" on philosophical topics. The gallery's parent organization, the Urban Cultural Arts Foundation (UCAF), was influential in having the surrounding neighborhood unofficially designated as the "African Village," reflecting its connection to local, African-American history and sponsored, for over a decade, an annual community arts event called the African Village Festival. UCAF was also influential in having the African-American art-themed Kwanzaa Playground built in nearby English Park. The park features playground equipment and other elements designed by local, African-American artists and promotes positive images of African-American culture.

Flag Wars
In 2003, Obadina and the gallery were prominently featured as major subjects in Flag Wars, a critically acclaimed but controversial documentary around the subject of gentrification. The film detailed cultural conflicts between longtime, black residents of Columbus' Olde Towne East neighborhood and younger, wealthier, gay, white, new residents moving into the area. The title of the film is a reference to the gay pride flags displayed by the new residents as set in opposition to the hand-carved, wooden sign hung over the gallery's door. The documentary was nominated for an Emmy Award, and won a Peabody Award.

References 

1989 establishments in Ohio
Art museums and galleries in Ohio
Organizations based in Columbus, Ohio
Culture of Columbus, Ohio